Nanterre is the prefecture of the Hauts-de-Seine department in the western suburbs of Paris. In 2018, the commune had a population of 96,807.

The eastern part of Nanterre, bordering the communes of Courbevoie and Puteaux, contains a small part of the La Défense business district of Paris and some of the tallest buildings in the Paris region. Because the headquarters of many major corporations are located in La Défense, the court of Nanterre is well known in the media for the number of high-profile lawsuits and trials that take place in it. The city of Nanterre also includes the Paris West University Nanterre La Défense, one of the largest universities in the Paris region.

Name
The name of Nanterre originated before the Roman conquest of Gaul. The Romans recorded the name as Nemetodorum. It is composed of the Celtic word nemeto meaning "shrine" or "sacred place" and the Celtic word duron (neuter) "hard, tough, enduring". The sacred place referred to is believed to have been a famous shrine that existed in ancient times.

Inhabitants of Nanterre are called "Nanterrien(ne)s" or "Nanterrois(es)".

History
The sacred shrine of antiquity that is referred to etymologically had been placed by tradition in Mont-Valérien. However, archeological discoveries made between 1994 and 2005 found a Gallic necropolis which has been dated to the third century BC, and also call into debate both the exact location of the pre-Roman capital of the Parisii and the initial site of Lutetia, the Roman era Paris. The large necropolis, as well as working people's homes from some time later in the ancient era, is near the bank of the Seine, in the northwest of Nanterre, and might be the sacred place that is being referred to etymologically.  Lutetia is mentioned by Julius Caesar in 50 BCE, reporting an assembly in Lutetia in 53 BC between himself, commander of the Roman Legions, and local Gallic leaders. Although this had been thought to possibly be Île de la Cité, largely since Caesar mentions an island, the river at Nanterre follows two channels around an island. In 52 BC, the Parisii took up arms with the Gallic war leader Vercingetorix, and were defeated by Titus Labienus, one of Caesar's legates. Caesar mentions in his Commentarii that the Parisii destroyed the bridges and set fire to Lutetia before the arrival of the Roman forces. The archeological work in Nanterre has suggested over 15 hectares of pre-Roman or Roman era construction. These archeologic findings may be an indication that Nanterre was the closest pre-Roman settlement to the city's modern centre.

Sainte Genevieve, patron saint of Paris, was born in Nanterre ca. 419–422.

On 27 March 2002, Richard Durn, a disgruntled local activist, shot and killed eight town councilors and 19 others were wounded in what the French press dubbed the Nanterre massacre. On 28 March, the murderer killed himself by jumping from the 4th floor of 36 Quai des Orfèvres, in Paris, while he was questioned by two policemen about the reason for his killing in the Nanterre City Hall.

Administration
Nanterre is divided into two cantons:
 Canton of Nanterre-1
 Canton of Nanterre-2

Transport
Nanterre is served by three stations on RER line A: Nanterre-Préfecture, Nanterre-Université, and Nanterre-Ville.

Nanterre-Université station is also an interchange station on the Transilien Paris-Saint-Lazare suburban rail line.

Economy
Société Générale has its headquarters in the Tours Société Générale in La Défense and Nanterre. The company moved into the building in 1995.

Faurecia, the sixth-largest automotive parts supplier, has its headquarters in Nanterre.

Groupe du Louvre and subsidiary Louvre Hôtels have their head office in Village 5 in La Défense and Nanterre.

Education
Senior high schools include:
 Lycée Joliot-Curie de Nanterre
 Lycée professionnel Louise-Michel
 Lycée professionnel Paul-Langevin
 Lycée professionnel Claude-Chappe

Sports
The basketball club Nanterre 92 plays at Palais des Sports Maurice Thorez.

The rugby union club Racing 92 opened the new Paris La Défense Arena in October 2017 and played their first game in the new facility in December 2017. It has a capacity of 32,000 for rugby and 40,000 for concerts. The venue opened as U Arena, but received its current name in June 2018 through a sponsorship deal with Paris La Défense, the company that manages the La Défense business district.

Demographics

Population

Immigration

International relations

Nanterre is twinned with:

 Craiova, Romania
 Pesaro, Italy
 Tlemcen, Algeria
 Veliky Novgorod, Russia
 Watford, England, United Kingdom
 Žilina, Slovakia

See also

 La Défense business district.
 List of tallest structures in Paris
Communes of the Hauts-de-Seine department

References

External links

 Official website
 Université Paris 10 Nanterre (in French)
 Nanterre students (in French)
 News coverage of March 2006 University occupation (in English)
 Pictures of Nanterre (in French)
 Nanterre Cathedral gallery of pictures

 
Communes of Hauts-de-Seine
Cities in Île-de-France
Prefectures in France